Jimmy Gatete (born December 11, 1979, in Bujumbura) is a retired Rwandan footballer.

Career
Gatete has made several appearances for the Rwanda national football team. He scored crucial goals during the 2004 African Cup of Nations (CAN) qualifications which saw the Rwanda national football team (Amavubi) reach its first ever CAN finals. The most celebrated goal in Rwandan history is presumably his goal against the Black Stars of Ghana at Stade Amahoro in Kigali in March 2003 which led to Rwanda's 1–0 win and handed them their ticket to Tunis the following year.

Gatete has played club football for local sides Mukura Victory Sports F.C., APR FC and Rayon Sport. He also had a brief spell in South Africa with Maritzburg United, and in Ethiopia with Saint George F.C.

Gatete scored 25 goals in 42 competitive appearances for Rwanda.

References

1979 births
Living people
Sportspeople from Bujumbura
Rwandan footballers
Rwandan expatriate footballers
Association football forwards
Rwanda international footballers
2004 African Cup of Nations players
APR F.C. players
Rayon Sports F.C. players
Maritzburg United F.C. players
Expatriate soccer players in South Africa
Rwandan expatriate sportspeople in South Africa